Type 28 may refer to:

Bristol Type 28, a British civil utility biplane
Peugeot Type 28, an automobile made by Peugeot
Nieuport Type 28, a French biplane fighter aircraft
The Great 28, a greatest hits album by classic rock and roller Chuck Berry 
Twenty-Eight Teeth, the third album from Buck-O-Nine
Type 28, a British hardened field defence of World War II

See also

 
 
 28 (disambiguation)
 T28 (disambiguation)